Romano Pontifici eligendo was the apostolic constitution governing the election of popes that was promulgated by Pope Paul VI on 1 October 1975. It instituted a number of far-reaching reforms in the process of electing popes. It set the maximum number of electors at 120 and restated in a more formal context the rule he had already instituted that cardinals over the age of 80 not participate in electing a pope.

The constitution was superseded by Universi Dominici gregis.

Provisions 
In November 1970 in Ingravescentem aetatem Pope Paul had prohibited cardinals over the age of eighty from participating in a papal conclave to elect a pope. This new apostolic constitution incorporated that rule in the context of setting out regulations for the organization of a conclave.

In March 1973, during a consistory to create new cardinals, Pope Paul had discussed plans to modify procedures for papal elections, including limiting the number of electors to 120 and adding as voters the patriarchs of the Eastern Rite churches, even if not cardinals, and the leadership of the Synod of Bishops. He abandoned all of those ideas except one, and in this apostolic constitution set the maximum number of cardinal electors at 120. When his 80-year-old limit had taken effect on 1 January 1971, there were 102 cardinals eligible to participate in a conclave. 

Pope Paul also imposed strict regulations on the physical organization of a conclave, including a requirement that the windows of the Sistine Chapel be boarded up. Cardinals found the restrictions excessive during the two conclaves of 1978 and Pope John Paul II dropped them in his 1996 apostolic constitution Universi Dominici gregis (1996).

Pope Paul had been crowned in June 1963 following his election but abandoned the wearing of a papal tiara in November 1964. Nevertheless, in this apostolic constitution he wrote that a coronation would follow the election. His immediate successors John Paul I and John Paul II chose not to be crowned, and John Paul II made no mention of a coronation when he revised the election process in 1996.

Notes

References

External links
Text of Romano Pontifici eligendo:
in English:  
 in Latin, Libreria Editrice Vaticana (with links at top right to text in French, Italian, and Spanish)

1975 documents
1975 in Christianity
Election of the Pope
Latin texts
Apostolic constitutions of Pope Paul VI